The 1998–1999 campaign was the 93rd season in Atlético Madrid's history and their 64th season in La Liga, the top division of Spanish football.

Season summary
Arrigo Sacchi was sacked in February with Atlético in the UEFA Cup quarter-finals but also mired in the bottom half of the table. B-team manager Carlos Sánchez Aguiar took charge for the next month, guiding Atlético to the UEFA Cup semi-finals, before handing the reins to Radomir Antić. Antić had guided the club to the title three years previously, but ultimately the high point of his second spell in charge would be reaching the Copa del Rey final, only to be thrashed 3-0 by Valencia. The league form under Antić continued to be mediocre and Atlético were also knocked out of the UEFA Cup in the semi-finals for the second season running, by eventual champions Parma. Although Atlético qualified for the UEFA Cup due to their domestic cup run, this season would prove to be the beginning of the end for Atlético's status as one of Spain's top clubs for most of the next decade; it would be five more years until Atlético recorded their next top-half finish, and another three before their return to European competition.

First-team squad
Squad at end of season

Left club during season

Competitions

La Liga

League table

Matches

Copa del Rey

Eightfinals

Quarterfinals

Semifinals

Final

UEFA Cup

First round
 

Atlético Madrid won 3–0 on aggregate.

Second round

Atlético Madrid won 5–2 on aggregate.

Third round

Atlético Madrid won 5–3 on aggregate.

Quarter-finals

Atlético Madrid won 4–2 on aggregate.

Semi-finals

Parma won 5–2 on aggregate.

References

1998-99
Spanish football clubs 1998–99 season